Pablo Alejandro Izaguirre (born April 9, 1970 in Avellaneda) is a former Argentine football player who is currently LD Alajuelense's Assistant Head Coach. 

He played in Argentina, Paraguay, Uruguay and Bolivia, but his best years were in the Costa Rican Primera División playing for LD Alajuelense. He made his debut in Costa Rican Primera División back on 1999 playing for LD Alajuelense against Deportivo Saprissa, but only lasted 11 minutes on the field where he received two early yellow cards. That was probably the worst game he had, after returning from suspension, he became one of the most beloved players in the history of the institution. He declared that his time in Costa Rica was the most important thing in his career and after his retirement, he decided to stay in the country and help his beloved team with their youth teams.

Back in 2007, he became Assistant head coach, first with Carlos Restrepo as the head coach, and currently with Luis Diego Arnáez as the head coach. They were teammates as a players from 1999 until 2005 when they decided to retire.

External links
 Clarin article

1970 births
Living people
Sportspeople from Avellaneda
Argentine footballers
San Martín de Tucumán footballers
Club Blooming players
Unión de Santa Fe footballers
Club Nacional de Football players
L.D. Alajuelense footballers
Expatriate footballers in Bolivia
Expatriate footballers in Paraguay
Argentine expatriate sportspeople in Bolivia
Expatriate footballers in Uruguay
Argentine expatriate sportspeople in Paraguay
Expatriate footballers in Costa Rica
Argentine expatriate sportspeople in Uruguay
Liga FPD players
Association football midfielders
Argentine expatriate sportspeople in Costa Rica